Sagarmatha Legends is one of the franchise teams of the Nepal Premier League. It is currently captained by a Nepal national player Binod Bhandari. The current head coach of the team is Jagat Tamata.

Players

Current Squad of Sagarmatha Legends 
 Binod Bhandari (c)
 Anil Mandal
 Chandra Sawad
 Mehboob Alam
 Paresh Lohani
 Lokendra Chand
 Rupesh Shrivastav
 Nischal Pandey
 Anupam Singh
 Nabin
 Dilip Nath
 Rupesh Bastola
 Sunil Dhamala

References

External links 
 
 News about Sagarmatha Legends and NPL at ekantipur.com
 News about Sagarmatha Legends at cricketingnepal.com
 News about Sagarmatha Legends and NPL at thehimalayantimes.com
 Cricketlok
 Cricnepal.com

Everest Premier League
Cricket teams in Nepal
Cricket clubs established in 2014
2014 establishments in Nepal